Satto (察度) (1321 – November 17, 1395) was King of Chūzan. He is the first ruler of Okinawa Island who was recorded by contemporary sources. His reign was marked by expansion and development of Chūzan's trade relations with other states, and the beginning of Okinawa's tributary relations with Ming dynasty China, a relationship that continued for roughly five hundred years, almost until the fall of the Qing dynasty.

Satto was Governor of the Urasoe district, which surrounded and included Chūzan's capital. On the death of chief Seii in 1350, Satto seized the throne for himself. His own line, or dynasty, however, did not last past his son, Bunei, who was ousted in 1405.

Chinese envoys arrived in Chūzan in 1372, requesting admission of Chinese cultural supremacy and that Okinawa send representatives to Nanjing. Satto complied with these requests without hesitation, as this granted him formal license to trade with the most powerful nation in the region. He sent his younger brother Taiki (泰期) to Nanjing in 1374, as the leader of a mission to formally submit to China, entering into tributary and trade relations. The Hongwu Emperor entertained the Ryukyuan mission, accepted their gifts, and sent them back with various gifts from China, including a royal seal, which served as a symbol of investiture. A Chinese official accompanied the returning mission, and represented the Imperial Court in officially confirming Satto as chief of Okinawa. Though Okinawa was never conquered or annexed by China, this custom of investiture, of formally confirming the chief in the eyes of the Chinese court, continued as part of tributary relations until the dismantling of the Ryūkyū Kingdom five centuries later. There were at least nine tributary missions to China over the next twenty years, three of them led by Taiki.

Diplomatic and trade relations were also established with a number of other states during Satto's reign, including the kingdoms of Korea and the Ayutthaya Kingdom of Thailand. Trade was conducted with these kingdoms, and with China and Japan, via a number of small islands that served as way-stations. Tanegashima, for example, was used as a transfer and supply point for traders bound for Japan's main islands and the Inland Sea. Miyakojima and the Yaeyama Islands, small islands to the south of Okinawa in the Ryukyu island chain, were among those that sent tribute to Chūzan.

Satto also established the Chinese immigrant community of Kumemura in 1392, a short distance from the capital at Shuri. These Chinese would, over the ensuing decades and centuries, intermarry with the local Okinawans; Kumemura grew into a center of Chinese studies, and its Chinese inhabitants and their descendants served the kingdom as diplomats, interpreters, and related roles.

Another important development introduced by Satto was the creation of the post of Ō-shō (王相), or King's Assistant. Though direct monarchical rule remained important and powerful in Okinawa for at least a few generations, this marked the beginnings of a bureaucracy that gradually replaced the chief's direct rule, drafting and implementing policy in his name.

Satto died in 1395, and was succeeded by his son Bunei. Missions sent to Nanjing announced the chief's death, and formally requested investiture for his successor. The "Chūzan Seikan" an official history book written by Haneji Chōshū in the 1650s, cites Satto's death as an example of tentō (天道), a concept closely related to the Confucian Mandate of Heaven. Though he describes Satto as a good chief overall, Shō accuses him of giving in to luxurious temptations and of losing the proper degree of humility; thus, Shō explains, Satto was guided by tentō to touch a venomous snake in his sleep and to be killed.

See also 
 Imperial Chinese missions to the Ryukyu Kingdom

Notes

References
 Kerr, George H. (1965). Okinawa, the History of an Island People. Rutland, Vermont: C.E. Tuttle Co. OCLC  39242121
 Smits, Gregory. (1999).  Visions of Ryukyu: Identity and Ideology in Early-Modern Thought and Politics, Honolulu: University of Hawaii Press. ; OCLC 39633631
  (2002). . Naha: Okinawa Bunka-sha. OCLC 170411659 (1997 ed.)
 Suganuma, Unryu. (2000). Sovereign Rights and Territorial Space in Sino-Japanese Relations: Irredentism and the Diaoyu/Senkaku Islands. Honolulu: University of Hawaii Press. ; ;  OCLC 170955369

Kings of Ryūkyū
1321 births
1395 deaths
14th-century Ryukyuan people